WENA (1330 AM) is a radio station broadcasting a Variety format. It is licensed to Yauco, Puerto Rico, and serves the Puerto Rico area. The station is owned by Southern Broadcasting Corporation.

References

External links

ENA
Radio stations established in 1979
1979 establishments in Puerto Rico
Yauco, Puerto Rico